Mike Morgan is a former running back in the National Football League. He played with the Chicago Bears during the 1978 NFL season.

References

Players of American football from Alabama
Chicago Bears players
American football running backs
Wisconsin Badgers football players
1956 births
Living people
People from Tallassee, Alabama